Hesperarcha is a genus of moths of the family Yponomeutidae.

Species
Hesperarcha pericentra - Meyrick, 1918 

Yponomeutidae